In classical antiquity, Illyria (Illyría or , Illyrís; , Illyricum) was a region in the western part of the Balkan Peninsula inhabited by numerous tribes of people collectively known as the Illyrians. Illyrians spoke the Illyrian language, an Indo-European language, which in ancient times perhaps also had speakers in some parts of Southern Italy.

The geographical term Illyris (distinct from Illyria) was sometimes used to define approximately the area of northern and central Albania down to the Aoös valley  (modern Vjosa), including in most periods much of the lakeland area. In Roman times the terms Illyria / Illyris / Illyricum were extended from the territory that was roughly located in the area of the south-eastern Adriatic coast (modern Albania and Montenegro) and its hinterland, to a broader region stretching between the Adriatic Sea and the Danube, and from the upper reaches of the Adriatic down to the Ardiaei.

From about mid-1st century BC the term Illyricum was used by the Romans for the province of the Empire that stretched along the eastern Adriatic coast north of the Drin river, south of which the Roman province of Macedonia began.

Etymology

In Greek mythology, the name of Illyria is aetiologically traced to Illyrius, the son of Cadmus and Harmonia, who eventually ruled Illyria and became the eponymous ancestor of the Illyrians. A later version of the myth identifies Polyphemus and Galatea as parents of Celtus, Galas, and Illyrius.

Ancient Greek writers used the name "Illyrian" to describe peoples between the Liburnians and Epirus. Fourth-century BC Greek writers clearly separated the people along the Adriatic coast from the Illyrians, and only in the 1st century AD was "Illyrian" used as a general term for all the peoples across the Adriatic. Writers also spoke of "Illyrians in the strict sense of the word"; Pomponius Mela (43 AD) the stricto sensu Illyrians lived north of the Taulantii and Enchele, on the Adriatic shore; Pliny the Elder used "properly named Illyrians" (Illyrii proprii/proprie dicti) for a small people south of Epidaurum, or between Epidaurum (now Cavtat) and Lissus (now Lezhë). In the Roman period, Illyricum, a term which signified a broader region than Illyria, was used for the area between the Adriatic and Danube.

History

The prehistory of Illyria and the Illyrians is known from archaeological evidence. The Romans conquered the region in 168 BC in the aftermath of the Illyrian Wars.

Kingdoms

The earliest recorded Illyrian kingdom was that of the Enchele in the 8th century BC. The era in which we observe other Illyrian kingdoms begins approximately at 400 BC and ends at 167 BC. The Autariatae under Pleurias (337 BC) were considered to have been a kingdom. The Kingdom of the Ardiaei began at 230 BC and ended at 167 BC. The most notable Illyrian kingdoms and dynasties were those of Bardyllis of the Dardani and of Agron of the Ardiaei who created the last and best-known Illyrian kingdom. Agron ruled over the Ardiaei and had extended his rule to other tribes as well. As for the Dardanians, they always had separate domains from the rest of the Illyrians.

The Illyrian kingdoms were composed of small areas within the region of Illyria. Only the Romans ruled the entire region. The internal organization of the south Illyrian kingdoms points to imitation of their neighbouring Greek kingdoms and influence from the Greek and Hellenistic world in the growth of their urban centres. Polybius gives as an image of society within an Illyrian kingdom as peasant infantry fought under aristocrats which he calls in Greek Polydynastae (Greek: Πολυδυνάστες) where each one controlled a town within the kingdom. The monarchy was established on hereditary lines and Illyrian rulers used marriages as a means of alliance with other powers. Pliny (23–79 AD) writes that the people that formed the nucleus of the Illyrian kingdom were 'Illyrians proper' or Illyrii proprie dicti. They were the Taulantii, the Pleraei, the Endirudini, Sasaei, Grabaei and the Labeatae. These later joined to form the Docleatae.

Roman and Byzantine rule
The Romans defeated Gentius, the last king of Illyria, at Scodra (in present-day Albania) in 168 BC and captured him, bringing him to Rome in 165 BC. Four client-republics were set up, which were in fact ruled by Rome. Later, the region was directly governed by Rome and organized as a province, with Scodra as its capital.

The Roman province of Illyricum replaced the formerly independent kingdom of Illyria. It stretched from the Drilon river in modern Albania to Istria (Croatia) in the west and to the Sava river (Bosnia and Herzegovina) in the north. Salona (near modern Split in Croatia) functioned as its capital.

After subduing a troublesome revolt of Pannonians and Daesitiates, Roman administrators dissolved the province of Illyricum and divided its lands between the new provinces of Pannonia in the north and Dalmatia in the south. Although this division occurred in 10 AD, the term Illyria remained in use in Late Latin and throughout the medieval period. After the division of the Roman Empire, the bishops of Thessalonica appointed papal vicars for Illyricum. The first of these vicars is said to have been Bishop Acholius or Ascholius (died 383 or 384), the friend of St. Basil. In the 5th century, the bishops of Illyria withdrew from communion with Rome, without attaching themselves to Constantinople, and remained for a time independent, but in 515, forty Illyrian bishops renewed their loyalty to Rome by declaring allegiance to Pope Hormisdas. The patriarchs of Constantinople succeeded in bringing Illyria under their jurisdiction in the 8th century.

Legacy

The name Illyria only disappears from the historical record after the Ottoman invasion of the Balkans in the 15th century, and re-emerges in the 17th century, acquiring a new significance in the Ottoman–Habsburg Wars, as Leopold I designated as the "Illyrian nation" the South Slavs in Hungarian territory. The term "Illyrian" was sometimes used for the language they spoke. Several armorials of the Early modern period, popularly called the "Illyrian Armorials", depicted fictional coats of arms of Illyria.

The name Illyria was revived by Napoleon for the Illyrian Provinces that were incorporated into the French Empire from 1809 to 1813, and the Kingdom of Illyria (1816–1849) was part of Austria until 1849, after which time it was not used in the reorganised Austro-Hungarian Empire.

The Illyrian movement was a South Slavic cultural and political campaign by a group of young Croatian and Serbian intellectuals during the first half of the 19th century, that led to Yugoslavism.

In culture
William Shakespeare chose a fictionalized Illyria as the setting for his play Twelfth Night. (In the modernized film spoof She's the Man, this function is served by "Illyria High School" in California.) Shakespeare also mentioned the region in the Part 2 of the play Henry VI.

An extensive history of Illyria by Charles du Fresne, sieur du Cange, was published by Joseph Keglevich in 1746.

Illyria is the setting for Jean-Paul Sartre's Les Mains Sales.

Lloyd Alexander's The Illyrian Adventure is set in Illyria in 1872.

John Hawkes' 1970 novel The Blood Oranges is set in a fictionalized Illyria.

There is a fictional Illyria with its inhabitants, winged fae, in the fantasy series A Court of Thorns and Roses by Sarah J. Maas.

Ky Kiske, one of the main characters of the fighting game franchise Guilty Gear, is the reigning monarch of a fictional nation known as "United Kingdoms of Illyria".

See also
Illyrian Tribes
List of ancient tribes in Illyria
Illyrian language
Proposed Illyrian vocabulary
List of rulers of Illyria
Illyrian warfare
Illyricum (Roman province)
Timeline of Illyrian history

References

Citations

Sources

External links

 
Illyrian Albania
Modern history of Slovenia
History of Dalmatia
History of Serbia
Geographic history of Bosnia and Herzegovina
Illyrian Montenegro
Illyrian Serbia
Historical regions